Vladimir Nikolayevich Krechin (born March 23, 1975) is a Russian former professional ice hockey player who played in the Russian Superleague (RSL). Krechin was drafted in the fifth round of the 1993 NHL Entry Draft by the Philadelphia Flyers and he played three seasons of junior hockey in North America for the Windsor Spitfires of the Ontario Hockey League before returning to Russia. He played eight seasons in the RSL for Traktor Chelyabinsk, Mechel Chelyabinsk, Lokomotiv Yaroslavl, and Metallurg Novokuznetsk. He was the general manager of the HC Kunlun Red Star for their inaugural season in 2016–17.

References

External links

1975 births
Living people
Lokomotiv Yaroslavl players
Metallurg Novokuznetsk players
Philadelphia Flyers draft picks
Russian ice hockey left wingers
Sportspeople from Chelyabinsk
Traktor Chelyabinsk players
Windsor Spitfires players